Mullingar was a constituency represented in the Irish House of Commons from 1612 to 1800.

Borough
The constituency represented the parliamentary borough of Mullingar.

Members of Parliament
 1560 Nicholas Casey and James Reling
 1585 Richard Casey and Redmond Pettit
 1613–1615: Nicholas Casey and John Hammond
 1634–1635: Edward Pettit and James Christabel
 1639–1649: Edward Pettit (died and replaced 1642 by Sir Richard Kennedy, 2nd Baronet) and Alexander Hope (died and replaced 1642 by Oliver Wheeler)
 1661–1666: Arthur Forbes, 1st Earl of Granard (sat for Tyrone and replaced by Sir Robert Newcomen) and James Leighe

1689–1801

Notes

References

Constituencies of the Parliament of Ireland (pre-1801)
Historic constituencies in County Westmeath
Mullingar
1612 establishments in Ireland
1800 disestablishments in Ireland
Constituencies established in 1612
Constituencies disestablished in 1800